Lily Hannah Alfeld (born 4 August 1995) is a New Zealand footballer who currently plays for and captains Wellington Phoenix. She has represented New Zealand at age group level.

Club career

Coastal Spirit
Alfeld played for Coastal Spirit in Christchurch from 2009 to 2013 in the Premier Women's Football division. She was part of the winning team who won the 2013 Women's Knockout Cup. She was also part of the 2011 team who made it to the finals of the cup before losing 3–0 to Glenfield Rovers.

Mainland Pride
Alfeld played for Mainland Pride from 2010 to 2013, where she was named Mainland Football Goalkeeper of the Year three times in 2010, 2011 and 2013. She won the National Women's League with the team in 2013, beating Northern Football 4–2 in the final.

Perth Glory
Alfeld played for Perth for the 2020–21 season. She was named players' player of the year for that season.

Wellington Phoenix
On 15 October, 2021, Alfeld was announced as the Wellington Phoenix's inaugural signing. Alfeld was later announced as the club's inaugural captain. After playing every match bar one of Wellington Phoenix's first season in the A-League Women, Alfeld re-signed for the 2022–23 A-League Women season in July 2022.

College career

Louisiana State University
Alfeld gained a scholarship to attend Louisiana State University (LSU) where she played for the LSU Tigers. While she saw 16 starts in her first season, she only played two more games across the other two seasons she was with the team.

International career
Alfeld has represented both the New Zealand U17's and New Zealand U20's attending 3 age group FIFA Women's World Cups.

Alfeld has received several call ups to the New Zealand women's national football team including for the 2022 SheBelieves Cup. She is yet to make her first appearance for the national side.

Career statistics

Club

Honours
Coastal Spirit
Women's Knockout Cup: 2013

Mainland Pride
National Women's League: 2013

References

External links

1995 births
Living people
New Zealand women's association footballers
Wellington Phoenix FC (A-League Women) players
Women's association football goalkeepers